Trybe TV is a 24 hours Nollywood movie channel owned by CMA Group. On 25 November 2015, Trybe TV was launched as a movie channel with Nollywood, Ghollywood and Yoruba speaking movies interposed with original lifestyle programming available in Nigeria on DSTV and GOtv.

Overview
Trybe TV launched on the MultiChoice DTT platform, GoTV airing movies from Nigerian, Ghanaian and Yoruba-speaking actors and actresses.  At 12 noon (WAT) on 17 November 2016, it launched on DStv with the Channel number 195. In addition to Nollywood movies, it also airs original series and short films, behind the scene from movie sets, red carpet events (such as the African Movie Academy Awards and interviews with stakeholders in the movie industry.

It is available only in Nigeria soon as it was launched which expansion to other countries in the year.

References

External links
 Official Facebook of Trybe TV

Movie channels
Mass media in Nigeria
Television channels and stations established in 2015
English-language television stations
Television stations in Lagos